Oleg Genrikhovich Ivanovsky (18 January 1922 – 18 September 2014) was a Soviet engineer, and pioneer of spacecraft construction.

Ivanovsky graduated from the Moscow Power Engineering Institute in 1953. Designer-General Sergei Korolev recruited him into the Soviet space program. Ivanovsky rose to chief designer at OKB-1, Korolev's design bureau. Among other things he was deputy principal designer of the first and second Sputniks, principal designer of Vostok manned spaceships, and creator of space probes. Ivanovsky personally helped Yuri Gagarin mount the gantry and climb into Vostok 1 and helped rebolt the hatch after Gagarin complained that it had not been closed and sealed correctly. He was said to be the last person to shake Gagarin's hand before the Vostok 1 flight. Ivanovsky was the Recipient of the Lenin Prize (1960) and USSR State Prize (1977).

References

Further reading 
 "Rockets and people" by B. E. Chertok: "mechanical engineering", 1999, - ;
 J. K. Golovanov, M., "Korolev: Facts and myths", Nauka, 1994, ;
 "Bank of the Universe" - edited by Boltenko A. C., Kiev, 2014., publishing house "Phoenix", 
 "S. P. Korolev. Encyclopedia of life and creativity" - edited by C. A. Lopota, RSC Energia. S. P. Korolev, 2014 

1922 births
2014 deaths
20th-century Russian engineers
Engineers from Moscow
Moscow Power Engineering Institute alumni
Lenin Prize winners
Recipients of the Medal "For Courage" (Russia)
Recipients of the Medal of Zhukov
Recipients of the Order of Honour (Russia)
Recipients of the Order of Lenin
Recipients of the Order of the Red Banner of Labour
Recipients of the Order of the Red Star
Recipients of the USSR State Prize
Early spaceflight scientists
Employees of RSC Energia
Rocket scientists
Russian aerospace engineers
Russian mechanical engineers
Russian memoirists
Russian space program personnel
Soviet aerospace engineers
Soviet mechanical engineers
Soviet memoirists
Soviet space program personnel